The Tinline River is a river of the Marlborough Region of New Zealand's South Island. It flows generally south from its sources at the northern end of the Bryant Range to reach the Pelorus River seven kilometres west of Pelorus Bridge. The river is named for John Tinline and commemorates the discovery of a route from Nelson to the Wairau.

See also
List of rivers of New Zealand

References

Rivers of the Marlborough Region
Rivers of New Zealand